The Buryat Autonomous Soviet Socialist Republic, abbreviated as Buryat ASSR, was an autonomous republic of the Russian SFSR within the Soviet Union.

History 
In 1923, the republic was created with the name Buryat-Mongol Autonomous Soviet Socialist Republic; its predecessor was the Buryat-Mongol Autonomous Oblast. In 1958, the name "Mongol" was removed from the name of the republic. 

In May 1929, the Party Central Committee decreed that Buryat agriculture would undergo "socialist reorganization" - Buryat resistance to the collectivist policy was fierce, with Buryat herders slaughtering their livestock rather than allowing them to be confiscated. Nevertheless, traditional livelihoods were forcibly altered under Soviet policy. Nomads were forcibly resettled on collectivist farms of cattle and sheep, trappers were made to rear sable in captivity, and Buryat hunters were forced to live in Party-approved "hunting stations".

In the 1930s, Buryat-Mongolia was one of the sites of Soviet studies aimed to disprove Nazi race theories. Amongst other things, Soviet physicians studied the "endurance and fatigue levels" of Russian, Buryat-Mongol, and Russian-Buryat-Mongol workers to prove that all three groups were equally able.

During World War II, the head of the ASSR was Gunsyn Tsydenova.

Dissolution 
The Buryat ASSR declared its sovereignty in 1990 and adopted the name Republic of Buryatia in 1992. However, it remained an autonomous republic within the Russian Federation.

See also 
 Buryatia
 State of Buryat-Mongolia
 First Secretary of the Buryat Communist Party

References

Sources 

 

Autonomous republics of the Russian Soviet Federative Socialist Republic
History of Buryatia
States and territories established in 1923
Former socialist republics
1923 establishments in the Soviet Union
1990 disestablishments in the Soviet Union